Seles may refer to:

 Seles, Angola, a municipality
 Battle of Seleš, a 1527 between ethnic Serbian Rebels and the Hungarian nobility
 a character in the Tales of Symphonia universe

People with the surname
 Laslo Seleš (born 1943), retired Yugoslavian football player
 Monica Seles (born 1973), Yugoslav-American professional tennis player

See also
 
 Sele (disambiguation)